Draško Milekić (born 15 October 1969) is a former Serbian football player.

References

1969 births
Living people
Serbian footballers
FK Borac Čačak players
FC Elista players
Serbian expatriate footballers
Expatriate footballers in Russia
Russian Premier League players
FK Hajduk Beograd players
Association football defenders